The Bunyip River is a perennial river of the Western Port catchment, located in the West Gippsland region of the Australian state of Victoria.

Location and features
The Bunyip River rises below Mount Beenak, part of the southern portion of the Yarra Ranges within the Bunyip State Park, near Tomahawk Gap, and flows generally south by east then south, at times via an aqueduct, joined by four minor tributaries, before reaching its confluence with the Tarago River to form the Main Drain.

Etymology
In the Aboriginal Boonwurrung language the name for the river is Banib, meaning "a fabulous, large, black amphibious monster".

The river is named after the bunyip, an Aboriginal mythological and legendary character from lakes and swamps.

See also

 List of rivers of Australia

References 

Melbourne Water catchment
Rivers of Greater Melbourne (region)
Rivers of Gippsland (region)
Western Port